Leptopetalum is a genus of flowering plants in the family Rubiaceae. The genus is widespread in tropical and subtropical Asia and the Pacific.

Species
, Plants of the World Online accepted the following species:

Leptopetalum biflorum (L.) Neupane & N.Wikstr.
Leptopetalum coreanum (H.Lév.) Naiki & Ohi-Toma
Leptopetalum foetidum (G.Forst.) Neupane & N.Wikstr.
Leptopetalum grayi (Hook.f.) Hatus.
Leptopetalum mexicanum Hook. & Arn.
Leptopetalum pachyphyllum (Tuyama) Naiki & Ohi-Toma
Leptopetalum pteritum (Blume) Neupane & N.Wikstr.
Leptopetalum racemosum (Lam.) Shih H.Chen & M.J.Wu
Leptopetalum strigulosum (DC.) Neupane & N.Wikstr.
Leptopetalum taiwanense (S.F.Huang & J.Murata) Shih H.Chen & M.J.Wu

References

Rubiaceae genera
Spermacoceae